Castles in Turkey were built in the Ancient and Medieval Times. The Turkish names for castle are kale, şato and hisar. Thus the names of some castles have  -kale or -hisarı suffixes.

External links 
Castles of Turkey KMZ File https://www.google.com/maps/d/edit?authuser=0&mid=1UlwwCBIWHgaa9sKSlNtDarAVPv0

Castles in Asia
Castles in Europe
Turkey
Lists of castles in Asia
Lists of castles in Europe
Ancient Anatolia
Castles
Castles
Turkey